The 2009 NBA draft was held on June 25, 2009, at the WaMu Theatre at Madison Square Garden in New York City. In this draft, the National Basketball Association (NBA) teams took turns selecting amateur U.S. college basketball players and other eligible players, including international players.

The Los Angeles Clippers, who won the draft lottery on May 19, 2009, used their first overall draft pick to draft Blake Griffin from University of Oklahoma. However, he missed the entire 2009–10 season due to surgery on his broken left kneecap, which he injured during the pre-season. Tanzanian-born Hasheem Thabeet from University of Connecticut was drafted second by the Memphis Grizzlies. Thabeet became the first player born in Tanzania to be drafted by an NBA team. James Harden was drafted 3rd by the Oklahoma City Thunder. This made him the first player to be drafted by the franchise as the Oklahoma City Thunder; the franchise moved from Seattle to OKC in 2008. The Sacramento Kings drafted Tyreke Evans 4th; he was named 2009–10 NBA Rookie of the Year, after he became the fourth NBA player in history to average at least 20 points, 5 rebounds and 5 assists in his rookie season, joining the elite club of Oscar Robertson (1960), Michael Jordan (1984) and LeBron James (2003). Spanish teenager Ricky Rubio was drafted 5th by the Minnesota Timberwolves. Rubio became the fifth-highest-drafted international player who never played U.S. college basketball to be drafted in the NBA, tied with Nikoloz Tskitishvili (5th in 2002), and behind Yao Ming (1st in 2002), Andrea Bargnani (1st in 2006), Darko Miličić (2nd in 2003) and Pau Gasol (3rd in 2001). Twenty-third pick Omri Casspi became the first Israeli player to be drafted in the first round, and later he became the first Israeli to play in the NBA.

The 2009 draft marked the first time three sons of former NBA players were selected in the top 15 picks of the draft. Stephen Curry, son of Dell Curry, was drafted 7th by the Golden State Warriors. Gerald Henderson Jr., son of Gerald Henderson, was drafted 12th by the Charlotte Bobcats. Austin Daye, son of Darren Daye, was drafted 15th by the Detroit Pistons. The draft also marked the first time a former high school player who skipped college to play professional basketball in Europe was selected in an NBA draft. Brandon Jennings, who skipped college to play professional basketball with Italian team Lottomatica Roma, was drafted 10th overall by the Milwaukee Bucks in the draft.

Of the 60 players drafted, four were freshmen, nine were sophomores, 12 were juniors, 22 were seniors, and 13 were international players without U.S. college basketball experience. The University of North Carolina's Tar Heels had the most players selected in the draft; three players were selected in the first round and one was selected in the second round. This marked the second time ever that four Tar Heels players were selected in the first two rounds of an NBA draft. The Minnesota Timberwolves had the league-high four first-round draft picks and the first time in team history that the team held two top-10 draft picks. The Timberwolves also had two second-round draft picks and became the team with the most draft picks in the 2009 draft with a total of six. The Houston Rockets and the Orlando Magic were the only NBA teams who did not have a draft pick this year, although Houston acquired three drafted players' rights after the draft.

From the players in this draft, there have been six players selected as All-Stars; out of these six, Curry and Harden have both won the NBA's regular season MVP award. This draft notably took place on the same day as the death of Michael Jackson.

Draft

Notable undrafted players
These players were not selected in the 2009 NBA draft but have played at least one game in the NBA.

Eligibility

The basic requirements for draft eligibility are:
 All drafted players must be born on or before December 31, 1990.
 Any player who is not an "international player", as defined in the collective bargaining agreement (CBA) between the NBA and its players union, must be at least one year removed from the graduation of his high school class.

The CBA defines "international players" as players who permanently resided outside the U.S. for three years prior to the draft, did not complete high school in the U.S., and have never enrolled at a U.S. college or university.

The basic requirement for automatic eligibility for a U.S. player is the completion of his college eligibility. Players who meet the CBA definition of "international players" are automatically eligible if their 22nd birthday falls during or before the calendar year of the draft (i.e., born on or before December 31, 1987). U.S. players who were at least one year removed from their high school graduation and have played professional basketball with a team outside the NBA were also automatically eligible. Former high school player Brandon Jennings meets these criteria, having graduated high school in 2008, skipped college basketball and then played professional basketball in Italy.

A player who is not automatically eligible must declare his eligibility for the draft by notifying the NBA offices in writing no later than 60 days before the draft. For the 2009 draft, this date fell on April 26. An early entry candidate is allowed to withdraw his eligibility for the draft by notifying the NBA offices in writing no later than 10 days before the draft. This year, a total of 74 collegiate players and 29 international players declared as early entry candidates. At the withdrawal deadline, 55 early-entry candidates withdrew from the draft, leaving 39 collegiate players and 10 international players as the early-entry candidates for the draft.

A player who has hired an agent will forfeit his remaining college eligibility, regardless of whether he is drafted. Also, while the collective bargaining agreement (CBA) between the league and its players' union allows a player to withdraw from the draft twice, the National Collegiate Athletic Association (NCAA) mandates that a player who has declared twice loses his college eligibility. This second provision affected Chase Budinger, Wayne Ellington, and Ty Lawson, all of whom declared for and withdrew from the 2008 draft.

Early entrants

College underclassmen
The following college basketball players successfully applied for early draft entrance.

  DeJuan Blair – F, Pittsburgh (sophomore)
  Derrick Brown – F, Xavier (junior)
  Chase Budinger – G, Arizona (junior)
 / Nick Calathes – G, Florida (sophomore)
  Earl Clark – F, Louisville (junior)
  Kareem Cooper – C, UTEP (junior)
  Brandon Costner – F, NC State (junior)
  Austin Daye – F, Gonzaga (sophomore)
  DeMar DeRozan – G, USC (freshman)
  Eric Devendorf – G, Syracuse (junior)
  Wayne Ellington – G, North Carolina (junior)
 / Chinemelu Elonu – F, Texas A&M (junior)
  Tyreke Evans – G, Memphis (freshman)
  Jonny Flynn – G, Syracuse (sophomore)
  Taj Gibson – F, USC (junior)
  Blake Griffin – F, Oklahoma (sophomore)
  D'Mond Grismore – F, Huston–Tillotson (junior)
  Roger Guignard – G, Texas–Arlington (junior)
  Daniel Hackett – G, USC (junior)
  James Harden – G, Arizona State (sophomore)
  Paul Harris – F, Syracuse (junior)
  Gerald Henderson Jr. – G, Duke (junior)
  Jordan Hill – F, Arizona (junior)
  Jrue Holiday – G, UCLA (freshman)
  James Johnson – F, Wake Forest (sophomore)
  Ty Lawson – G, North Carolina (junior)
  Darnell Lindsay – G, Tennessee Tech (junior)
  Jodie Meeks – G, Kentucky (junior)
  Nate Miles – G, Southern Idaho (freshman)
  Patty Mills – G, Saint Mary's (sophomore)
 / Byron Mullens – C, Ohio State (freshman)
 / Ronald Ogoke – C, Paul Quinn (junior)
  DaJuan Summers – F, Georgetown (junior)
  Shawn Taggart – F, Memphis (junior)
  Jeff Teague – G, Wake Forest (sophomore)
  Hasheem Thabeet – C, Connecticut (junior)
  Dar Tucker – G, DePaul (sophomore)

International players
The following international players successfully applied for early draft entrance.

  Rodrigue Beaubois – G, Cholet (France)
  Omri Casspi – F, Maccabi Tel Aviv (Israel)
  Víctor Claver – F, Pamesa Valencia (Spain)
  Christian Eyenga – F, CB Prat (Spain)
  Vítor Faverani – F, Clinicas Rincón (Spain)
  Sergiy Gladyr – G, MBC Mykolaiv (Ukraine)
  Barış Hersek – F, Darüşşafaka (Turkey)
  Ricky Rubio – G, DKV Joventut (Spain)
  İbrahim Yıldırım – G, Banvit (Turkey)

Draft lottery

The lottery selection to determine the order of the top fourteen picks in the 2009 draft occurred on May 19, 2009. The Los Angeles Clippers won the first pick, while the Memphis Grizzlies and Oklahoma City Thunder moved up to second and third picks respectively. The Sacramento Kings and Washington Wizards, who had the two best chances to land a top-three pick, fell down to the fourth and fifth spots, the lowest possible picks they could be awarded through the lottery. The remaining first-round picks and all the second-round picks were assigned to teams in reverse order of their win–loss records in the previous season. As is commonplace in the event of identical win–loss records, the NBA performed a random drawing to break the ties on April 17, 2009.

Below were the chances for each team to get specific picks in the 2009 draft lottery, rounded to three decimal places:

Trades involving draft picks

Pre-draft trades
Prior to the day of the draft, the following trades were made and resulted in exchanges of draft picks between the teams.
 On June 24, 2009, Minnesota acquired the 5th pick, Etan Thomas, Darius Songaila and Oleksiy Pecherov from Washington in exchange for Randy Foye and Mike Miller. Minnesota used the 5th pick to draft Ricky Rubio.
 On July 31, 2007, Minnesota re-acquired their 2009 first-round draft pick along with Al Jefferson, Gerald Green, Ryan Gomes, Sebastian Telfair, Theo Ratliff, a 2009 first-round draft pick and cash considerations from Boston in exchange for Kevin Garnett. Previously, Boston acquired a 2009 first-round draft pick, Wally Szczerbiak, Michael Olowokandi and Dwayne Jones on January 26, 2006 from Minnesota in exchange for Ricky Davis, Marcus Banks, Mark Blount, Justin Reed and two second-round draft picks. Minnesota used the 28th pick to draft Wayne Ellington.
 On October 24, 2007, Minnesota acquired a 2009 first-round draft pick, Antoine Walker, Wayne Simien, Michael Doleac and cash considerations from Miami in exchange for Ricky Davis and Mark Blount. Minnesota used the 18th pick to draft Ty Lawson.
 On June 24, 2009, Portland acquired the 22nd pick from Dallas in exchange for the 24th pick, 56th pick and a 2010 second-round draft pick. Portland used the 22nd pick to draft Víctor Claver and Dallas used the 24th and 56th pick to draft Byron Mullens and Ahmad Nivins, respectively.
 On August 14, 2008, Sacramento acquired a 2009 first-round draft pick, Bobby Jackson, Donté Greene and cash considerations from Houston in exchange for Ron Artest, Sean Singletary and Patrick Ewing Jr. Sacramento used the 23rd pick to draft Omri Casspi.
 On February 20, 2008, Oklahoma City (as Seattle) acquired a 2009 first-round draft pick, Francisco Elson and Brent Barry from San Antonio in exchange for Kurt Thomas. Oklahoma City used the 25th pick to draft Rodrigue Beaubois.
 On February 19, 2009, Chicago acquired Denver's 2009 first-round draft pick from Oklahoma City in exchange for Thabo Sefolosha. Previously, Oklahoma City acquired a 2009 first-round draft pick, Chucky Atkins and cash considerations on January 7, 2009 from Denver in exchange for a 2009 second-round draft pick and Johan Petro. Chicago used the 26th pick to draft Taj Gibson.
 On February 19, 2009, Memphis acquired a 2009 first-round draft pick, Mike Wilks, Adonal Foyle and cash considerations from Orlando in a three-team trade with Orlando and Houston. Memphis used the 27th pick to draft DeMarre Carroll.
 On June 26, 2008, Portland acquired a 2009 second-round draft pick from the L.A. Clippers in exchange for the draft rights to Mike Taylor. Portland used the 33rd pick to draft Dante Cunningham.
 On January 7, 2009, Denver acquired a 2009 second-round draft pick and Johan Petro from Oklahoma City in exchange for a 2009 first-round draft pick, Chucky Atkins and cash considerations. Denver used the 34th pick to draft Sergio Llull.
 On October 31, 2005, Detroit acquired a 2009 second-round draft pick from Minnesota in exchange for Ronald Dupree. Detroit used the 35th pick to draft DaJuan Summers.
 On December 24, 2008, Memphis re-acquired their 2009 second-round draft pick along with Steve Francis and cash considerations from Houston in exchange for a 2011 second-round draft pick. Previously, Houston acquired a 2009 second-round draft pick and the draft rights to Donté Greene from Memphis in a three-team trade with Memphis and Portland on June 26, 2008.
 On June 26, 2008, San Antonio acquired Golden State's 2009 second-round draft pick, the draft rights to Malik Hairston and cash considerations from Phoenix in exchange for the draft rights to Goran Dragić. Previously, Phoenix acquired 2007 and 2009 second-round draft picks on January 3, 2005 from Golden State in exchange for Žarko Čabarkapa. San Antonio used the 37th pick to draft DeJuan Blair.
 On June 26, 2008, Portland acquired a 2009 second-round draft pick from Denver in a three-team trade with Denver and Chicago. Portland also acquired New York's 2009 second-round draft pick and Chicago's 2010 second-round draft pick from Chicago. Previously, Chicago acquired a 2006 first-round draft pick, 2007 and 2009 second-round draft picks, an option to exchange 2007 first-round draft picks, Tim Thomas, Michael Sweetney and Jermaine Jackson on October 4, 2005 from New York in exchange for Eddy Curry and Antonio Davis. Portland used the 38th and 55th pick to draft Jon Brockman and Patrick Mills, respectively.
 On June 15, 2007, Detroit acquired 2009 and 2011 second-round draft picks from Toronto in exchange for Carlos Delfino. Detroit used the 39th pick to draft Jonas Jerebko.
 On August 11, 2008, Charlotte acquired New Jersey's 2009 second-round draft pick from Oklahoma City in exchange for the draft rights to Kyle Weaver. Previously, Oklahoma City (as Seattle) acquired a 2009 second-round draft pick on July 7, 2006 from New Jersey in exchange for Mikki Moore. Charlotte used the 40th pick to draft Derrick Brown.
 On December 6, 2004, the L.A. Lakers acquired 2005 and 2009 second-round draft picks from Charlotte in exchange for Kareem Rush. The L.A. Lakers used the 42nd pick to draft Patrick Beverley.
 On June 28, 2007, Miami acquired a 2009 second-round draft pick from Indiana in exchange for the draft rights to Stanko Barać. Miami used the 43rd pick to draft Marcus Thornton.
 On June 26, 2008, Minnesota acquired Philadelphia's and Miami's 2009 second-round draft picks and cash considerations from Miami in exchange for the draft rights to Mario Chalmers. Previously, Miami acquired a 2009 second-round draft pick, the draft rights to Daequan Cook and cash considerations on June 28, 2007 from Philadelphia in exchange for the draft rights to Jason Smith. Minnesota used the 45th and 47th pick to draft Nick Calathes and Henk Norel, respectively.
 On February 21, 2008, Cleveland acquired Ben Wallace, Joe Smith and a 2009 second-round draft pick from Chicago in a three-team trade with Chicago and Oklahoma City (as Seattle). Cleveland used the 46th pick to draft Danny Green.
 On June 21, 2006, San Antonio acquired New Orleans's 2009 second-round draft pick, Matt Bonner and Eric Williams from Toronto in exchange for Rasho Nesterović. Previously, Toronto acquired Miami's 2006 second-round draft pick and New Orleans's 2009 second-round draft pick on January 31, 2006 from New Orleans in exchange for Aaron Williams. San Antonio used the 51st pick to draft Jack McClinton.
 On October 10, 2008, Indiana acquired 2009 and 2010 second-round draft picks, Eddie Jones and cash considerations from Dallas in exchange for Shawne Williams. Indiana used the 52nd pick to draft A. J. Price.
 On July 12, 2007, San Antonio acquired a 2009 second-round draft pick, Vassilis Spanoulis and cash considerations from Houston in exchange for Jackie Butler and the draft rights to Luis Scola. San Antonio used the 53rd pick to draft Nando de Colo.
 On February 13, 2007, Charlotte acquired a 2009 second-round draft pick, Eric Williams and cash considerations from San Antonio in exchange for Melvin Ely. Charlotte used the 54th pick to draft Robert Vaden.
 On July 20, 2007, Phoenix acquired Orlando's 2009 second-round draft pick from Oklahoma City (as Seattle) in exchange for 2008 and 2010 first-round draft picks and Kurt Thomas. Previously, Oklahoma City (as Seattle) acquired a 2009 second-round draft pick on July 11, 2007 from Orlando in exchange for Rashard Lewis. Phoenix used the 57th pick to draft Emir Preldžič.
 On June 26, 2008, Miami acquired a 2009 second-round draft pick from Cleveland in exchange for the draft rights to Darnell Jackson. Miami used the 60th pick to draft Robert Dozier.

Draft-day trades
The following trades involving drafted players were made on the day of the draft.
 Denver acquired the draft rights to 18th pick Ty Lawson from Minnesota in exchange for a future conditional first-round draft pick.
 Oklahoma City acquired the draft rights to 24th pick Byron Mullens from Dallas in exchange for the draft rights to 25th pick Rodrigue Beaubois and a 2010 second-round draft pick.
 New York acquired the draft rights to 29th pick Toney Douglas from the L.A. Lakers in exchange for a 2011 second-round draft pick and cash considerations.
 Portland acquired the draft rights to 31st pick Jeff Pendergraph from Sacramento in exchange for Sergio Rodríguez, the draft rights to 38th pick Jon Brockman and cash considerations.
 Houston acquired the draft rights to 32nd pick Jermaine Taylor from Washington in exchange for cash considerations.
 Houston acquired the draft rights to 34th pick Sergio Llull from Denver in exchange for cash considerations.
 Miami acquired the draft rights to 42nd pick Patrick Beverley from the L.A. Lakers in exchange for a 2011 second-round draft pick and cash considerations.
 New Orleans acquired the draft rights to 43rd pick Marcus Thornton from Miami in exchange for 2010 and 2012 second-round draft picks.
 Houston acquired the draft rights to 44th pick Chase Budinger from Detroit in exchange for a future second-round draft pick and cash considerations.
 Dallas acquired the draft rights to 45th pick Nick Calathes from Minnesota in exchange for a 2010 second-round draft pick and cash considerations.
 Oklahoma City acquired the draft rights to 54th pick Robert Vaden from Charlotte in exchange for cash considerations.
 Cleveland acquired the draft rights to 57th pick Emir Preldžič from Phoenix in exchange for cash considerations.

See also
 List of first overall NBA draft picks

References
General

Specific

External links

2009 NBA Draft – ESPN
2009 NBA Draft Grades & Analysis
2009 NBA Draft History
2009 NBA Draft Basketball Reference Records

Draft
National Basketball Association draft
NBA draft
NBA draft
2000s in Manhattan
Basketball in New York City
Sporting events in New York City
Sports in Manhattan
Madison Square Garden